Stephanie Hazlett (born January 29, 1979) is an American former professional tennis player.

A native of Indiana, Hazlett attended Heritage Hills H.S. and in 1996 secured the school's first state championship across all sports, winning the girls' singles tournament. Her junior tennis career included an Easter Bowl title in 1995 for the 16s age group. She played collegiate tennis for the University of Florida and was a two-time All-American.

Hazlett reached a best singles world ranking of 283 on the professional tour. In 2003 she won her first ITF Circuit event in Evansville, Indiana, a tournament that her mother Anna was involved in running. She also won a $25,000 ITF tournament in Puebla, Mexico later that year, partnering Kaysie Smashey in the doubles.

ITF Circuit finals

Singles: 2 (1–1)

Doubles: 3 (2–1)

References

External links
 
 

1979 births
Living people
American female tennis players
Florida Gators women's tennis players
Tennis people from Indiana